

Current listings

|}

Former listing

|}

References 

 
Coos County